Tianji may refer to:

Tianji.com, Chinese social networking website
Tianji, Funan County, Anhui, China
Tianji Subdistrict, Huainan, Anhui, China
Guangxi Tianji F.C., Chinese football club

See also
Tian Ji ( 4th century BC), military general of the state of Qi